West Branch Cussewago Creek is a  long 2nd order tributary to Cussewago Creek in Crawford and Erie Counties, Pennsylvania.  This is the only stream of this name in the United States.

Course
West Branch Cussewago Creek rises in a pond about 1 mile northwest of Lavery, Pennsylvania, and then flows generally south to join Cussewago creek about 0.25 miles west of Crossingville.

Watershed
West Branch Cussewago Creek drains  of area, receives about 45.1 in/year of precipitation, has a wetness index of 501.45, and is about 57% forested.

See also
 List of rivers of Pennsylvania

References

Rivers of Pennsylvania
Rivers of Crawford County, Pennsylvania
Rivers of Erie County, Pennsylvania